Ronne Arnold (1938 – 13 February 2020), also credited as Ronnie Arnold , was an African American performer, whose Australian-based career spanning some seven decades encompassed various genres. He was a dancer, choreographer, tutor, singer and actor and dance company founder.

Biography
Arnold was born in Philadelphia, Pennsylvania in 1938. He was trained in jazz traditions by his family, and his first dance teacher, Nadia Chilkovsky Nahumck, taught him American classical, modern, primitive and Hindu dance styles at the Philadelphia Dance Academy. In 1959, he graduated with a Bachelor of Music majoring in dance from the University of the Arts.

In 1960, Arnold joined the touring cast of West Side Story for Garnet Carroll in Australia, and before he returned to the United States, he was offered a role in musical  The Most Happy Fella, after which he decided to  remain in Australia permanently. He became a renowned teacher of jazz and modern dance, and choreographed dance sequences for Sydney's Chequers nightclub, as well performing as the Leading Player in the 1974 Australian production of Pippin and appearing with Carlotta in a production of Cinderella as the evil stepmother at the Sydney Opera House. He was founder and artistic director of the Contemporary Dance Company of Australia from 1967 to 1972, and academic course director at the National Aboriginal and Islander Skills Development Association from 1986 to 2003. After completing a master's degree at the University of Sydney, he began teaching at the Wesley Institute.

In August 2013, Arnold was awarded the lifetime achievement award at the Australian Dance Awards. He also worked as a television actor, appearing in recurring roles on Number 96 and Holiday Island.

Death
Arnold died on 13 February 2020, aged 81 or 82, at Blue Mountains Hospital in Katoomba, New South Wales.

Filmography

References

External links

1938 births
2020 deaths
20th-century American dancers
American emigrants to Australia
American choreographers
African-American male dancers
African-American choreographers
African-American male actors
University of the Arts (Philadelphia) alumni
University of Sydney alumni
20th-century African-American people
21st-century African-American people